Iriney Santos da Silva (born 23 April 1981), known simply as Iriney, is a Brazilian former professional footballer who played as a central midfielder.

He also held a Spanish passport, having spent more than one decade playing in the country, mainly with Rayo Vallecano and Betis (three years apiece). He amassed La Liga totals of 151 matches and two goals during seven seasons, with Rayo, Celta, Almería, Betis and Granada.

Football career
Born in Humaitá, Amazonas, Iriney made his professional debut with Associação Desportiva São Caetano in 2000, and moved to Spain with Rayo Vallecano three years later. First-choice since his beginnings with the Madrid side, he did saw them drop two consecutive divisions; he made his La Liga debut on 23 February 2003, playing the full 90 minutes in a 0–4 home loss against Valencia CF.

In the summer of 2005, Iriney joined RC Celta de Vigo, being one of the Galicians' most consistent players during his two-season spell in the top level. Following the 2007 relegation he decided to leave, but was unable to find a new team due to a lengthy judicial battle until the 2008 January transfer window, when he signed with UD Almería.
 
Subsequently, after gaining match practice, Iriney was relatively used during his stay in Andalusia, with Almería consecutively retaining their top flight status. In late June 2009 his contract expired and he moved to neighbours Real Betis, freshly relegated to the second level. He contributed with 36 matches – 35 starts – and three goals in his second season as they returned to the main division as champions and, on 25 February 2012, played his 100th official match with the Verdiblancos, against Getafe CF.

After repeatedly refusing to renew his contract, Iriney joined neighbouring Granada CF also in the first division, signing for three years as a free agent. After only one, however, he moved sides again, agreeing to a two-year deal with Watford for an undisclosed fee.

Iriney made his debut in the League Championship on 3 August 2013, starting and finishing the 1–0 win at Birmingham City. On 31 January of the following year, he returned to Spain after being loaned to division two's RCD Mallorca until the end of the season.

References

External links

1981 births
Living people
Sportspeople from Amazonas (Brazilian state)
Naturalised citizens of Spain
Brazilian footballers
Association football midfielders
Campeonato Brasileiro Série A players
Nacional Futebol Clube players
Associação Desportiva São Caetano players
La Liga players
Segunda División players
Segunda División B players
Rayo Vallecano players
RC Celta de Vigo players
UD Almería players
Real Betis players
Granada CF footballers
RCD Mallorca players
English Football League players
Watford F.C. players
Brazilian expatriate footballers
Expatriate footballers in Spain
Expatriate footballers in England
Brazilian expatriate sportspeople in Spain
Brazilian expatriate sportspeople in England